This article provides details of international football games played by the Ethiopia national football team from 2020 to present.

Results

2020

2021

2022

References

Ethiopia national football team
2020s in Ethiopian sport